The Tribe is the debut album by Caspar Brötzmann Massaker. It was released in 1987 through Zensor.

Track listing

Personnel 
Musicians
Jon Beuth – drums
Caspar Brötzmann – guitar, vocals, production
Eduardo Delgado-Lopez – bass guitar, vocals
Production and additional personnel
Winnie Blobel – photography
Peter Brötzmann – illustrations
Jost Gebers – recording
Andreas Hilbig – mixing

References

External links 
 

1987 debut albums
Caspar Brötzmann albums